The Vault is a novel by British crime-writer Ruth Rendell, published in 2011.  The novel is the 23rd in the Inspector Wexford series. It is a sequel to her previous standalone novel A Sight For Sore Eyes. The novel is the first sequel Rendell has written, and the first to feature Wexford in retirement.

Plot summary
Reg and Dora Wexford have moved from Kingsmarkham to a renovated London Coachhouse owned by their daughter Sheila.  Although Wexford has retired he acts as a consultant to a friend who works for the Metropolitan Police.  Together they investigate the mystery of the remains of four bodies which have been discovered in Orcadia Cottage, an old house situated in the suburb of St. John's Wood.

References

2011 British novels
Novels by Ruth Rendell
British mystery novels
Novels set in London
Inspector Wexford series
Hutchinson (publisher) books